Beer is a relatively small lunar impact crater located on the Mare Imbrium, to the east of the crater Timocharis. It was named after German astronomer Wilhelm W. Beer. Just to the northwest is the matching twin Feuillée. 

Beer is a circular, cup-shaped crater with a sharp-edged rim that has not been significantly eroded. The interior has a higher albedo than the surrounding lunar mare, which is usually an indication of a relatively young crater. A string of craters arc away from the rim to the southeast, which then grade into a straight rille, and were once known as Fossa Archimedes or Archimedes Rille, but now are officially unnamed.

The mare to the east has a higher albedo than the surrounding surface, and this lighter-hued surface reaches to the base of the Montes Archimedes. To the southeast of Beer is a lunar dome that is of comparable diameter to the crater.

Satellite craters
By convention these features are identified on lunar maps by placing the letter on the side of the crater midpoint that is closest to Beer.

External links
 Beer Lunar Topographic Orthophotomap, LTO41A4, May 1974

References

 
 
 
 
 
 
 
 
 
 
 

Impact craters on the Moon
Mare Imbrium